The 1971–72 European Cup was the seventh edition of the European Cup, IIHF's premier European club ice hockey tournament. The season started on August 30, 1971 and finished on December 15, 1972.

The tournament was won by CSKA Moscow, who beat Brynäs IF in the final

First round

 Brynäs IF,   
 Ässät  :  bye

Second round

Third round

 Dukla Jihlava,    
 CSKA Moscow  :  bye

Semifinals

Finals

References 
 Season 1972

1
IIHF European Cup